Vendrogno was a comune (municipality) in the Province of Lecco in the Italian region Lombardy, located about  north of Milan and about  north of Lecco; part of Bellano since the 1° january 2020.
 
The location is accessible from the main valley Valsassina, 4 km from the municipality of Taceno, and the Lake Como, which is  8 km distant by the municipality of Bellano.

Vendrogno used to border the following municipalities: Bellano, Casargo, Dervio, Parlasco, Taceno, Tremenico.

San Lorenzo is the name of the church in the center of Vendrogno. There are several other churches located in Vendrogno.

References

External links
 Official website

Cities and towns in Lombardy
Valsassina